

Wynsige (died 975) was a medieval Bishop of Lichfield.

Wynsige was consecrated between 963 and 964 and died in 975.

Notes

Citations

References

External links
 

975 deaths
10th-century English bishops
Anglo-Saxon bishops of Lichfield
Year of birth unknown